The Chita Constituency (No.43) is a Russian legislative constituency in Zabaykalsky Krai. In 1993-2007 the constituency was based in Western Chita Oblast, stretching from Kalarsky District in the north to Krasnochikoysky District in the west, including the city of Chita. In 2008 Chita Oblast merged with Agin-Buryat Autonomous Okrug to form Zabaykalsky Krai, and newly-configured Chita constituency now includes eastern half of Chita and northern parts of the Krai.

Members elected

Election results

1993

|-
! colspan=2 style="background-color:#E9E9E9;text-align:left;vertical-align:top;" |Candidate
! style="background-color:#E9E9E9;text-align:left;vertical-align:top;" |Party
! style="background-color:#E9E9E9;text-align:right;" |Votes
! style="background-color:#E9E9E9;text-align:right;" |%
|-
|style="background-color:"|
|align=left|Sergey Markidonov
|align=left|Independent
|
|20.36%
|-
|style="background-color:"|
|align=left|Namzhil Tsybikov
|align=left|Independent
| -
|14.90%
|-
| colspan="5" style="background-color:#E9E9E9;"|
|- style="font-weight:bold"
| colspan="3" style="text-align:left;" | Total
| 
| 100%
|-
| colspan="5" style="background-color:#E9E9E9;"|
|- style="font-weight:bold"
| colspan="4" |Source:
|
|}

1995

|-
! colspan=2 style="background-color:#E9E9E9;text-align:left;vertical-align:top;" |Candidate
! style="background-color:#E9E9E9;text-align:left;vertical-align:top;" |Party
! style="background-color:#E9E9E9;text-align:right;" |Votes
! style="background-color:#E9E9E9;text-align:right;" |%
|-
|style="background-color:"|
|align=left|Viktor Kurochkin
|align=left|Independent
|
|21.90%
|-
|style="background-color:#F21A29"|
|align=left|Pyotr Suturin
|align=left|Trade Unions and Industrialists – Union of Labour
|
|14.46%
|-
|style="background-color:"|
|align=left|Vladimir Bogatov
|align=left|Liberal Democratic Party
|
|13.58%
|-
|style="background-color:"|
|align=left|Erast Galumov
|align=left|Independent
|
|12.43%
|-
|style="background-color:#23238E"|
|align=left|Namzhil Tsybikov
|align=left|Our Home – Russia
|
|8.28%
|-
|style="background-color:"|
|align=left|Olga Michudo
|align=left|Independent
|
|7.63%
|-
|style="background-color:"|
|align=left|Oleg Ladygin
|align=left|Independent
|
|5.91%
|-
|style="background-color:"|
|align=left|Viktor Kanin
|align=left|Independent
|
|2.09%
|-
|style="background-color:#2C299A"|
|align=left|Mikhail Kostromin
|align=left|Congress of Russian Communities
|
|1.76%
|-
|style="background-color:#959698"|
|align=left|Vladimir Khomyakov
|align=left|Derzhava
|
|1.52%
|-
|style="background-color:#000000"|
|colspan=2 |against all
|
|8.54%
|-
| colspan="5" style="background-color:#E9E9E9;"|
|- style="font-weight:bold"
| colspan="3" style="text-align:left;" | Total
| 
| 100%
|-
| colspan="5" style="background-color:#E9E9E9;"|
|- style="font-weight:bold"
| colspan="4" |Source:
|
|}

1999

|-
! colspan=2 style="background-color:#E9E9E9;text-align:left;vertical-align:top;" |Candidate
! style="background-color:#E9E9E9;text-align:left;vertical-align:top;" |Party
! style="background-color:#E9E9E9;text-align:right;" |Votes
! style="background-color:#E9E9E9;text-align:right;" |%
|-
|style="background-color:"|
|align=left|Viktor Voytenko
|align=left|Independent
|
|19.85%
|-
|style="background-color:"|
|align=left|Vitaly Vishnyakov
|align=left|Independent
|
|16.50%
|-
|style="background-color:"|
|align=left|Viktor Ostanin
|align=left|Independent
|
|15.01%
|-
|style="background-color:"|
|align=left|Viktor Kurochkin (incumbent)
|align=left|Independent
|
|13.81%
|-
|style="background-color:"|
|align=left|Vladimir Bogatov
|align=left|Liberal Democratic Party
|
|11.74%
|-
|style="background-color:"|
|align=left|Valery Torgaev
|align=left|Independent
|
|3.82%
|-
|style="background-color:"|
|align=left|Olga Michudo
|align=left|Independent
|
|3.82%
|-
|style="background-color:#FF4400"|
|align=left|Aleksandr Barinov
|align=left|Andrey Nikolayev and Svyatoslav Fyodorov Bloc
|
|2.29%
|-
|style="background-color:"|
|align=left|Igor Kolkutin
|align=left|Independent
|
|1.27%
|-
|style="background-color:"|
|align=left|Aleksandr Zhdanov
|align=left|Independent
|
|1.07%
|-
|style="background-color:#000000"|
|colspan=2 |against all
|
|9.05%
|-
| colspan="5" style="background-color:#E9E9E9;"|
|- style="font-weight:bold"
| colspan="3" style="text-align:left;" | Total
| 
| 100%
|-
| colspan="5" style="background-color:#E9E9E9;"|
|- style="font-weight:bold"
| colspan="4" |Source:
|
|}

2003

|-
! colspan=2 style="background-color:#E9E9E9;text-align:left;vertical-align:top;" |Candidate
! style="background-color:#E9E9E9;text-align:left;vertical-align:top;" |Party
! style="background-color:#E9E9E9;text-align:right;" |Votes
! style="background-color:#E9E9E9;text-align:right;" |%
|-
|style="background-color:"|
|align=left|Viktor Voytenko (incumbent)
|align=left|People's Party
|
|25.32%
|-
|style="background-color:"|
|align=left|Anatoly Romanov
|align=left|United Russia
|
|24.42%
|-
|style="background-color:"|
|align=left|Viktor Ostanin
|align=left|Independent
|
|21.65%
|-
|style="background-color:"|
|align=left|Yury Nikonov
|align=left|Liberal Democratic Party
|
|5.55%
|-
|style="background-color:"|
|align=left|Irina Glazyrina
|align=left|Yabloko
|
|3.91%
|-
|style="background-color:"|
|align=left|Andrey Zhidkin
|align=left|Independent
|
|3.20%
|-
|style="background-color:#11007D"|
|align=left|Vladimir Palkin
|align=left|Unity
|
|1.52%
|-
|style="background-color:"|
|align=left|Yury Grigoryev
|align=left|Independent
|
|1.25%
|-
|style="background-color:#000000"|
|colspan=2 |against all
|
|11.57%
|-
| colspan="5" style="background-color:#E9E9E9;"|
|- style="font-weight:bold"
| colspan="3" style="text-align:left;" | Total
| 
| 100%
|-
| colspan="5" style="background-color:#E9E9E9;"|
|- style="font-weight:bold"
| colspan="4" |Source:
|
|}

2016

|-
! colspan=2 style="background-color:#E9E9E9;text-align:left;vertical-align:top;" |Candidate
! style="background-color:#E9E9E9;text-align:left;vertical-align:top;" |Party
! style="background-color:#E9E9E9;text-align:right;" |Votes
! style="background-color:#E9E9E9;text-align:right;" |%
|-
|style="background-color:"|
|align=left|Nikolay Govorin
|align=left|United Russia
|
|54.56%
|-
|style="background-color:"|
|align=left|Yury Volkov
|align=left|Liberal Democratic Party
|
|12.22%
|-
|style="background-color:"|
|align=left|Vladimir Pozdnyakov
|align=left|Communist Party
|
|9.70%
|-
|style="background-color:"|
|align=left|Vyacheslav Ushakov
|align=left|Patriots of Russia
|
|6.51%
|-
|style="background-color:"|
|align=left|Valery Afitsinsky
|align=left|A Just Russia
|
|5.45%
|-
|style="background-color:"|
|align=left|Vyacheslav Pimenov
|align=left|Communists of Russia
|
|4.49%
|-
|style="background-color:"|
|align=left|Aleksandr Katushev
|align=left|Rodina
|
|2.24%
|-
| colspan="5" style="background-color:#E9E9E9;"|
|- style="font-weight:bold"
| colspan="3" style="text-align:left;" | Total
| 
| 100%
|-
| colspan="5" style="background-color:#E9E9E9;"|
|- style="font-weight:bold"
| colspan="4" |Source:
|
|}

2021

|-
! colspan=2 style="background-color:#E9E9E9;text-align:left;vertical-align:top;" |Candidate
! style="background-color:#E9E9E9;text-align:left;vertical-align:top;" |Party
! style="background-color:#E9E9E9;text-align:right;" |Votes
! style="background-color:#E9E9E9;text-align:right;" |%
|-
|style="background-color:"|
|align=left|Aleksandr Skachkov
|align=left|United Russia
|
|38.48%
|-
|style="background-color:"|
|align=left|Yelena Titova
|align=left|Communist Party
|
|19.06%
|-
|style="background-color:"|
|align=left|Yury Volkov
|align=left|A Just Russia — For Truth
|
|10.94%
|-
|style="background-color:"|
|align=left|Boris Basakin
|align=left|New People
|
|8.28%
|-
|style="background-color:"|
|align=left|Georgy Shilin
|align=left|Liberal Democratic Party
|
|6.79%
|-
|style="background-color: "|
|align=left|Anatoly Pichugin
|align=left|Party of Pensioners
|
|5.46%
|-
|style="background: "| 
|align=left|Valery Afitsinsky
|align=left|The Greens
|
|4.00%
|-
|style="background:"| 
|align=left|Viktor Sheremetyev
|align=left|Communists of Russia
|
|2.01%
|-
| colspan="5" style="background-color:#E9E9E9;"|
|- style="font-weight:bold"
| colspan="3" style="text-align:left;" | Total
| 
| 100%
|-
| colspan="5" style="background-color:#E9E9E9;"|
|- style="font-weight:bold"
| colspan="4" |Source:
|
|}

Notes

References

Russian legislative constituencies
Politics of Zabaykalsky Krai